Halud Vihara is  west-southwest from the World Heritage Site of Somapura Mahavihara, at Pahapur in the Naogaon District of Bangladesh.The main feature of the site is "a large mound 100 feet across and 25 feet high", but there are other mounds and remains of brick structures.  Some sculpture has been removed from the site, which has also suffered considerably from the local inhabitants removing bricks for reuse. It is located at Halud Vihara village, which is also locally known as Dvipganj. Excavations show that it was an early Medieval Buddhist site, from a similar time period to Somapura Mahavihara and to the Sitakot Vihara in Nawabganj Upazila of Dinajpur District.

World Heritage status 
This site was added to the UNESCO World Heritage Tentative List on February 17, 1999 in the cultural category.

See also
 List of archaeological sites in Bangladesh

References

Buildings and structures completed in the 9th century
Buddhist monasteries in Bangladesh
Ancient universities of the Indian subcontinent
Archaeological sites in Bangladesh
Former populated places in Bangladesh
Pala Empire
Buddhist sites in Bangladesh
Naogaon District